The Hawks' Club is a members-only social club for sportsmen at the University of Cambridge. Founded in 1872, the club represents the best sportsmen in the University of Cambridge. Membership is by election only, and the usual criterion is that the candidate should have his Blue. Many famous sporting names have been, or are, members, including Rob Andrew, Mike Atherton, Chris Brasher, Ted Dexter, Gavin Hastings, Tony Lewis and George Nash.

History
The Hawks' Club was formed in 1872 when a proposal to allow members of other colleges into the St John's College Eagles club was rejected. This led to the Hawks' being set up as an equivalent club university-wide. In its early history, it was primarily a cricket club, but by the turn of the century, other sports were well represented.

As is common with student-run organisations, records are patchy in places and old lists of presidents and members have long been lost. The record is better for the period 1889–1963, as during this time a picture of each year's president was added to a display in the clubhouse, and these have survived to the present day. During the 1950s a number of subsequently notable sportsmen were presidents, and several are listed below.

It is not known whether a Blue was originally a prerequisite for membership; some early presidents do not appear to have competed against Oxford in any sport. However, the personal 'suitability' of candidates for membership does not appear to have changed since the Club was founded. The Club website states that "Candidates have to be clubbable" (i.e. "clubbable" in the sense of a traditional gentlemen's club) and "the Hawks' Club remains unashamedly elite", claiming to include only "the top one per cent" of University sportsmen.

Membership

Eligibility criteria
Application for membership is open to any man who is either a member of any college at the University of Cambridge or who has been admitted ad eundem to the University. He must have spent at least one term in residence, and should have earned a Full Blue, Half Blue or Second Team Colours (in a full blue sport) by representing the University against Oxford in a Varsity Match.

Election process
A prospective applicant must be proposed, seconded, and have six further members sign their application form. The proposer is normally the team captain for the relevant sport and the seconder must be a member of the Hawks' Committee. The application is then reviewed by the committee: two "no" votes will reject an applicant, and he may not be proposed again at a later date.

Members are admitted for life. The number of Hawks-in-residence at the University is limited to 230, not including MAs; there are several thousand members worldwide.

Occasionally, individuals are admitted as an Honorary Hawk without fulfilling the above criteria (for example Prince Philip, Duke of Edinburgh, who did not study at Cambridge).

Dining Rights Club 
Since 1993, individuals have also been elected to The Hawks Dining Rights Club. Members may use the clubhouse but do not become Hawks. Neither the Cambridge-only nor the men-only restrictions apply in this case, and the majority of Dining Rights members are local business people and professionals who contribute to the costs of running the Club, and to The Hawks’ Trust which is a charity supporting all sportsmen and women at the University. There are slightly fewer dining rights members than Hawks-in-residence, and the number peaked at 160 in 1998.

Regalia
The Club colours are maroon and gold; members may wear the Club tie. Honorary Hawks and Dining Rights members wear a plain tie with a gold Hawk.

Committee
The Club's Committee consists of a President, Honorary Secretary, Junior Treasurer and seven ordinary members, and is elected each academic year by the Hawks-in-residence.

There is a Management Committee of the Trustees, the President and the Secretary of the Club, the Steward and the DRC President, who guide the Club's development.

Clubhouse

The clubhouse was originally on Trinity Street, but by the 1890s it had moved to a St John's College property in All Saints' Passage. It remained there until 1966 when financial troubles meant the property had to be sold, despite surviving through both world wars, during which the Club was closed. After this, it briefly occupied the same premises as the Pitt Club, until conflicts of interest regarding the differing objectives of the two clubs made this no longer possible.

There was no clubhouse until 1986 when a four-storey building at 18 Portugal Place became available. This property was bought by a group of members, who restored it from its previous existence as a dilapidated hotel staff hostel. The restored clubhouse was opened by the Duke of Edinburgh in October 1992. It consists of a bar, members' lounge, dining room space for some 25-30 people, and the Club steward's flat on the top floor.

Resident Hawks voted in advisory votes in 2017 (85% in favour) and January 2019 (89% in favour) on the question of allowing resident Ospreys (Cambridge women's sports club) to pay for access arrangements to the Hawks’ clubhouse. 1,400 non-resident Hawks (out of 4,480 members) voted 89% in favour of the proposal in an online ballot run by Electoral Reform Services in February and March 2019.

The Club Today

Hawks' Charitable Trust
The Club actively supports students who have financial difficulties keeping up their sport. Each year the Club awards a number of bursaries to members of the University under the auspices of the Hawks' Charitable Trust. These awards are equally available to both men and women, and total around £40,000 each year.

Events
The Club promotes Rumboogie and La Vida Lola, events each Wednesday and Sunday evening at the Cambridge nightclubs Revolution and Lola Lo. 

At the end of each Michaelmas term, the London Dinner is hosted by the club, usually at one of the large hotels, the night before the Varsity Rugby Match. 

The Committee also hosts an event each June during May Week in the style of a Cambridge May Ball - "The Hawks' Event", at Fenner's Cricket Ground. 

In recent years a "Hawks' Charity Dinner" has been held in Lent term and a "Charity Ball" in Michaelmas in conjunction with the Ospreys.

in 2012, the Club raised £4000 for a local charity that aims to help disadvantaged children access sporting initiatives.

Club Awards
In 2004 two Club awards were introduced: Hawk of the Year and Team of the Year:

In 2010, the International Honours Book was created to record and detail the Olympic and International achievements of its members. There are currently full internationals in residence in fencing, squash, rifle shooting, rowing and rugby union.

The Hawk
The Hawk is published biannually. The newsletter includes, among other things, news of current University teams and results, obituaries of notable members, and Club notices.

Reciprocal clubs
Members have reciprocal rights with a number of similar clubs around the world.

United Kingdom

The Army & Navy Club, London
The Bury St Edmunds Farmers Club, Suffolk
Cardiff and County Club, Cardiff
The City of London Club, London
City University Club, London
The Clifton Club, Bristol
The Gridiron Club, Oxford
The Harrogate Club, Harrogate
Leander Club, Henley-on-Thames
Manchester Tennis & Racquet Club, Salford
National Liberal Club, London
The New Club, Cheltenham
The New Club, Edinburgh
The Norfolk Club, Norwich
The Northern Lawn Tennis Club, Manchester
Nottingham Club, Nottingham
Oxford and Cambridge Club, London
Royal Ocean Racing Club, London
The St James’s Club, Manchester
The Travellers Club, London
Vincent’s Club, Oxford
The Winchester House Club, London

Overseas

The British Club Bangkok, Thailand
BrodyLand,  Budapest, Hungary
DO7 Eco Club House, Milan
Durban Club, Durban, South Africa
Embassy Club, Iowa, USA
The Graduate Club, New Haven, USA
Melbourne Savage Club, Melbourne, Australia
Pretoria Country Club, Waterkloof, South Africa
Rand Club, Johannesburg, South Africa
University Club of Toronto, Toronto, Canada

Notable members
Monarchs:

 King George VI - CULTC
 King Charles III - CUPC

Members of the Royal Family:

 Prince Henry, Duke of Gloucester - CUPC
 Louis Mountbatten, 1st Earl Mountbatten of Burma
 Prince Philip, Duke of Edinburgh
 Antony Armstrong-Jones, 1st Earl of Snowdon - Former husband of Princess Margaret, CUBC

Sportsmen:

Rob Andrew - England rugby player 1985-1997, CURUFC, CUCC
Mike Atherton - England Cricket Captain 1993-1998, CUCC
Bunny Austin - Davis Cup Winner and Wimbledon, Roland-Garros Finalist, CULTC
Trevor Bailey - England cricketer 1949-1959, CUCC
Mike Biggar - Scotland Rugby Captain, CURUFC
Karan Bilimoria, Baron Bilimoria - Founder of Cobra Beer Ltd, CUPC
Henry Blofeld  - Cricket commentator, CUCC
Chris Brasher  - Olympic Gold 1956, CUAC
Godfrey Brown - Olympic Gold 1936, CUAC
 Sir Ralph Kilner Brown - High Court Judge, WWII Brigadier, CUAC
John Butterfield, Baron Butterfield - Vice-Chancellor of the University of Nottingham (1971-1975) and University of Cambridge (1983-1985) Universities, Master of Downing College 1978-1987, CURUFC, CUCC, CULTC, CURTC, CUHC
 Sir Adrian Cadbury - Businessman, CUBC, CUSSC
 Bernie Cotton - GB Hockey player and Olympic Gold winning coach, CUHC
 Mark Cox - Davis Cup finalist, Australian and US Open quarter-finalist, CULTC
 James Cracknell - Olympic Gold 2000 & 2004, CUBC
Ted Dexter - England Cricket Captain 1961/2-1963 & 1964, former MCC President, CUCC
Richard Dodds - Olympic Gold 1988, GB Hockey Captain, CUHC
 R. K. von Goldstein - Headmaster of the Bishop Cotton School, India
 Mike Gibson - Ireland rugby player, CURUFC
Gavin Hastings - Scotland Rugby Captain, CURUFC
James Horwill - Australian Rugby Captain, CURUFC
Steve James - England Cricketer 1998, CUCC, CURUFC
Tom James - Double Olympic Gold 2008 & 2012, CUBC
Hugh Laurie - Actor, CUBC
Laddie Lucas - Distinguished wartime RAF pilot, MP, International golfer, CUGC
John Lecky - Chairman of Canada 3000 airline, Olympic Silver 1960, CUBC, CURUFC
Tony Lewis  - England Cricket Captain 1972/3, Presenter BBC Cricket 1980 - 1999, CUCC, CURUFC
Douglas Lowe - Olympic Gold 1924 & 1928 - CUAC
George Mann  - England Cricket Captain 1948/9-1949, CUCC
Christopher Martin-Jenkins - Cricket commentator, CUCC, CURFC
Peter May - England Cricket captain 1955-1959/60 & 1961, CUCC
Richard Meade - Triple Olympic Gold 1968 & 1972, CURC
George Nash - Olympic Gold 2016, Bronze 2012, CUBC
John Pritchard - Olympic Silver 1980, CUBC
David Sheppard - Bishop of Liverpool, England Cricket captain 1954, CUCC
Ed Smith - England Cricketer 2003, CUCC
Ken Scotland - Scotland rugby player, CURUFC
Sir Peter Studd  - 643rd Lord Mayor of London; CUCC, CURUFC
Bruce Tulloh - Olympian and European Champion, CUAC
Bob Tisdall - Irish Olympic Gold medallist 1932, CUAC
Tony Underwood - England rugby player 1992-1998, CURUFC, CUAC
Flip van der Merwe - South African rugby player, CURUFC
Kieran West  - Olympic Gold medallist 2000, CUBC
Max Woosnam - Britain's Greatest Sportsman, Olympic Gold and Silver medallist 1920, Wimbledon Champion, Davis Cup captain, England and Manchester City F.C. captain, CUAFC, CUCC, CULTC, CURTC, CUGC

See also
 University Sporting Blue
 Varsity Match
 Vincent’s Club, the equivalent club at Oxford University

Bibliography
 The Hawk, editors Kolbert, C. and Hyde, A., No. 9 (October 2005), published by The Hawks Club.
 Rules of the Hawks' Club (May 2003).

References

External links
Hawks' Club website
Ospreys website — an equivalent club for the sportswomen of the University
Blue Bird website, - the Hawks' Club newspaper for comprehensive coverage of all Cambridge sporting matters

Organizations established in 1872
Clubs and societies of the University of Cambridge
Gentlemen's clubs in England
St John's College, Cambridge
1872 establishments in England